Former United States Post Office may refer to:

 Former United States Post Office (Belmont, North Carolina)
 Former United States Post Office (Smithfield, North Carolina)
 Former United States Post Office (Kaukauna, Wisconsin)